The Early Bird Aircraft Company was an American aircraft manufacturer based in Erie, Colorado. The company specialized in the design and manufacture of historical replica aircraft, sold as both kits or as just printed plans for amateur construction. The company's designs were marketed for a time by Leading Edge Air Foils.

The company produced two designs. The Early Bird Spad 13 is an 80% scale replica of the First World War SPAD S.XIII fighter. The Early Bird Jenny is a 67% scale replica of the First World War Curtiss JN-4 Jenny trainer. Both aircraft are constructed from  a mix of steel and aluminum tubing, with some wooden parts and with flying surfaces covered in doped aircraft fabric.

Aircraft

References

Defunct aircraft manufacturers of the United States
Replica aircraft manufacturers
Homebuilt aircraft